The canton of Tourouvre au Perche (before March 2020: canton of Tourouvre) is an administrative division of the Orne department, northwestern France. Its borders were modified at the French canton reorganisation which came into effect in March 2015. Its seat is in Tourouvre au Perche.

It consists of the following communes:
 
Les Aspres
Auguaise
Beaulieu
Bizou
Bonnefoi
Bonsmoulins
Brethel
La Chapelle-Viel
Charencey
Crulai
La Ferrière-au-Doyen
Les Genettes
L'Hôme-Chamondot
Irai
Longny les Villages
Le Mage
Le Ménil-Bérard
Les Menus
Moulins-la-Marche
Le Pas-Saint-l'Homer
Saint-Hilaire-sur-Risle
Tourouvre au Perche
La Ventrouze

References

Cantons of Orne